WILK-FM (103.1 MHz, "WILK Newsradio") is a commercial news/talk radio station licensed to Avoca, Pennsylvania. Owned by Audacy, Inc., WILK-FM extends its broadcast range throughout Northeastern Pennsylvania with three full-power repeaters: WILK in Wilkes-Barre, WODS in West Hazleton and WAAF in Scranton. In addition to a standard analog transmission, WILK-FM broadcasts over two HD Radio channels with a sports gambling format on its HD2 digital subchannel, and is available online via Audacy.

WILK-FM has a weekday schedule with mostly local hosts.  At night, the stations air nationally syndicated shows including Dave Ramsey, Ben Shapiro, Coast to Coast AM with George Noory and America in The Morning.  Weekends feature shows on money, health, technology and science.  Weekend syndicated hosts include Kim Komando, Clark Howard, Dr. Michio Kaku and "Somewhere in Time" with Art Bell. Most hours begin with world and national news from ABC News Radio.  

The stations also carries play-by-play sports including Penn State Nittany Lions football and basketball, as well as Wilkes-Barre/Scranton Penguins minor league hockey.

History
The station signed-on in 1976 with the call sign WACM. Originally licensed to Freeland, Pennsylvania, the station aired a syndicated Top 40/Soft Rock radio format with some local news. From the late 1980s and into the early 1990s, the station switched to an oldies music format and was branded as Oldies 103.

The station's programming during this time period was simulcast on sister station WXPX AM 1300. The simulcast relationship between the two stations exists today even though both went through a number of call sign changes, format changes, ownership changes, and the 103.1 MHz FM allocation being moved to Avoca. The stations, now WILK-FM and WODS, both simulcast the WILK NewsRadio network.

On February 23, 2022, WILK-FM added The Bet to its HD2 subchannel.

References

External links

ILK-FM
Radio stations established in 1976
Audacy, Inc. radio stations
News and talk radio stations in the United States